The Third Program of the CPSU is the main document of the Communist Party of the Soviet Union, adopted at its 22nd Congress on October 31, 1961. The main goal of the program was to create a plan for the construction of communism. (It was the first and only program that was approved while the party had this name; previous programs were approved when the party was named RSDLP and VKPb.)

The core of the new approach to building communism was an attempt to replace Stalin's harsh administrative "pressure from above" with socialist self-government based on the principles of communist morality. The moral code of the builder of communism was an integral part of the Third Program, and so are the renewal of Druzhinas and Comrades' courts, and the general introduction of the moral principles of collectivism, initiative, comradely mutual assistance, and personal responsibility for the collective good. Many of these social reforms later formed the basis of understanding the 1960 in the Soviet Union (Khrushchev Thaw and early Stagnation).

History of creation 

The 19th Congress came to the conclusion that fundamental changes had taken place since the adoption of the Second Program of the Party. Consequently, the congress decided to consider it necessary to rework the Party Program. At the 20th Congress, the Central Committee was instructed "to prepare a draft Program of the CPSU, based on the main provisions of Marxist-Leninist theory, creatively developing on the basis of the historical experience of our party, the experience of the fraternal parties of the socialist countries, the experience and achievements of the entire international communist and workers' movement, and taking into account the long-term plan being prepared for communist construction, development of the economy and culture of the Soviet Union".

To develop the draft program, a working group was created, which was located in the "Sosny" sanatorium retreat of the Administration of the Central Committee of the CPSU in the Moscow region, headed by Secretary of the Central Committee of the CPSU Boris Ponomarev. Initial work on the creation of a draft of the new Program began in mid-1958, and eventually, about 100 major scientists and specialists worked on it for three years.

In June 1958, on behalf of Otto Wille Kuusinen, one of the secretaries and a member of the Presidium of the Central Committee of the CPSU, thematic assignments were sent to scientific institutions, government departments and public organizations. Special tasks were assigned to academicians Eugen Varga and Stanislav Strumilin, and they subsequently prepared the article "On the Ways of Building Communism", which provided development prospects for 10–15 years. On July 25, 1959, the Presidium set the accents: academicians will deal with the theory, and the practical calculations, that is, how much, when and where will the industry and agriculture produce, should be submitted by the State Planning Commission (Gosplan) and the State Economic Commission.

By the spring of 1961, work on the project was completed, and its text was given to the First Secretary of the CPSU Central Committee Nikita Khrushchev. In late April 1961, he formulated his comments. After the appropriate revision, the draft Program was considered on May 24 at the Presidium of the Central Committee of the CPSU and on June 19 at the Plenum of the Central Committee. On July 26, 1961, at a meeting of the Presidium of the Central Committee of the CPSU, the text of the draft program provided by the program commission was approved.

National discussion 

On July 30, 1961, the text of the draft Program was published in the Pravda and Izvestia newspapers so that the population could familiarize themselves with it and express suggestions and comments. Local party cells sent reports to the capital on the discussion of the draft party program. Newspapers and magazines were supposed to collect letters from the population that came to the editors and related to the draft program, and send them for processing and analysis to specially created working groups that summarized proposals on various topics, for example, on the ethnic issues.

By September 15, 1961, 6 magazines and 20 newspapers received a total of 29,070 pieces of correspondence, of which 5,039 were published. In total, almost 44 million people attended party conferences and worker meetings dedicated to the discussion of this document. Taking into account the letters to local newspapers, party organs, radio and television, the number of published pieces was 17,080 according to data cited by the historian Alexander Pyzhikov.

Structure 

Introduction
Part One TRANSITION FROM CAPITALISM TO COMMUNISM — THE PATH OF HUMANITY DEVELOPMENT
 The historical inevitability of the transition from capitalism to socialism
 The world-historical significance of the October Revolution and the victory of socialism in the USSR
 World system of socialism
 Crisis of world capitalism
 International revolutionary movement of the working class
 National liberation movement
 Fight against bourgeois and reformist ideology
 Peaceful coexistence and the struggle for universal peace
 Part Two TASKS OF THE COMMUNIST PARTY OF THE SOVIET UNION TO BUILD A COMMUNIST SOCIETY
 Communism the bright future of all mankind
 The tasks of the party in the field of economic construction, the creation and development of the material and technical base of communism
 Development of industry, construction, transport, and their role in the creation of the productive forces of communism
 Development of agriculture and social relations in the countryside
 Management of the national economy and planning
 Tasks of the party in the field of raising the material well-being of the people
 Tasks of the party in the field of state building and further development of socialist democracy
 Councils and the development of democratic principles of public administration
 Further enhancement of the role of public organizations. State and communism
 Strengthening the Armed Forces and the defense capability of the Soviet Union
 Tasks of the party in the field of ethnic relations
 Tasks of the party in the field of ideology, upbringing, education, science and culture
 In the field of education of communist consciousness
 In the field of public education
 In the field of science
 In the field of cultural construction, literature and art
 The building of communism in the USSR and the cooperation of the socialist countries
 The party in the period of progressing construction of communism

See also 

 The moral code of the builder of communism

Bibliography 
Full text:
  (in Russian)
 Programme of the Communist Party of the Soviet Union. Adopted by the 22nd Congress of the C.P.S.U. October 31, 1961 (in English)

References 

Documents of the Communist Party of the Soviet Union
Ideology of the Communist Party of the Soviet Union
Party platforms
1961 documents